Uloborus gilvus is a spider species found in Italy and Greece.

See also 
 List of Uloboridae species

References

External links 

Uloboridae
Spiders of Europe
Spiders described in 1870